Al-Khamisiyah (also spelled Khamissiyeh) is a Syrian village located in Markaz Rif Dimashq, Douma District. Al-Khamisiyah had a population of 1,024 in the 2004 census.

References

Populated places in Douma District
Villages in Syria